Paul Howard Frampton is an English theoretical physicist who works in particle theory and cosmology. From 1996 until 2014, he was the Louis D. Rubin, Jr. Distinguished Professor of physics and astronomy, at the University of North Carolina at Chapel Hill. He is affiliated with the Department of Mathematics and Physics of the University of Salento, in Italy.

Early life
Born in Kidderminster, England, Frampton attended King Charles School, 1954–62 and then Brasenose College, Oxford, 1962–68. He received BA (Double First) in 1965, MA, DPhil in 1968, and DSc in 1984, all degrees from Oxford University.

Career
He is a Fellow of the American Association for the Advancement of Science (1990) and the American Physical Society (1981). In 1987 he was the project director for siting the Superconducting Supercollider, in North Carolina. A Festschrift for his 60th birthday has been published.

His DPhil thesis analyzed the relationship between current algebra and superconvergence sum rules, and contained a 1967 sum rule. In 1970, he analyzed the absence of ghosts in the dual resonance model.

Three examples of his model building are the chiral color model, in 1987, which predicts axigluons; the 331 model, in 1992, which can explain the number of quark-lepton generations, and predicts bileptons; his proposal, in 1995, of the binary tetrahedral group as a flavor symmetry. All three serve as targets of opportunity for the Large Hadron Collider (LHC). In 2002, he built a model relating matter–antimatter asymmetry in the early universe to measurements possible on Earth. In 2015, he showed that the 331-model predicts long-lived quarks accessible to Run 2 of the LHC.
	
In formal directions, three examples are that he calculated, in 1976, the rate of vacuum decay in quantum field theory; in 1982, he analyzed ten-dimensional gauge field theory, and its hexagon anomaly, precursor to the first superstring revolution; in 1988, he constructed the Lagrangian which describes the dynamics of the p-adic string.
 	
For cosmology, two examples are, in 2007, he built a cyclic model which can solve a 75-year-old entropy problem; in 2010, he discussed how dark energy may be better understood by studying temperature and entropy. In 2015, he demonstrated how cyclic entropy can lead to
flat geometry without an inflationary era and estimated the time until contraction to be close to one hundred times the present age of the universe. In 2015 he also proposed a novel theory of dark matter, where the dark matter constituents are primordial black holes with many solar masses.

Drug smuggling conviction
In January 2012, Frampton was arrested at the Buenos Aires airport after checking in a bag containing 2 kilograms of cocaine hidden in the lining. That November, Frampton was convicted of drug smuggling in Argentina and was sentenced to four years and eight months in detention. He said that he was a victim of a romance scam, and that he was tricked into transporting the suitcase. While in prison, Frampton was diagnosed with schizoid personality disorder by a forensic psychologist hired by his legal team, a condition which Frampton says makes him gullible and more susceptible to such a scam.

Soon after his arrest, his pay was stopped and he was placed on personal leave. The move was widely criticized by the academic community. He was fired from his UNC post in 2014. On 16 June 2015, an appeals court in North Carolina unanimously ruled that his university violated its own policies by placing Frampton on unpaid leave while he awaited trial, and ordered the university to restore Frampton's back salary and benefits. Frampton's account of these events was published in 2014.

Under Argentine law, a foreign national can be released from prison and deported after serving half of his sentence. Frampton was granted such release and returned to England in 2015, agreeing to never return to Argentina.

Subsequent work 
Since his return to England, Frampton has continued to author physics papers. These include A new direction for dark matter research: intermediate-mass compact halo objects (2016), Exploring scalar and vector bileptons at the LHC in a 331 model (2018), and Electromagnetic accelerating universe (2022).

Publications
Frampton's first publication was Chirality Commutator and Vector Mesons, in 1967. He has published over 480 articles on particle theory and cosmology. He was the author of a book on string theory, in 1974 (2nd edition, 1986), when it was still named the dual resonance model. In 1986, he published a book on quantum field theory (2nd edition 2000, 3rd edition 2008). 
A book on cyclic cosmology, for the general public, was published in 2009. A book on the history of particle theory appeared in 2020.

References

External links
Paul Frampton's home page
Paul Frampton's publications at Google Scholar
 Researchgate references to/by Paul Frampton, Univ. of Salento

1943 births
20th-century British physicists
21st-century British physicists
Living people
Alumni of Brasenose College, Oxford
English people convicted of drug offences
English people imprisoned abroad
Theoretical physicists
University of North Carolina at Chapel Hill faculty
Particle physicists
Phenomenologists
People from Kidderminster
Fellows of the American Association for the Advancement of Science
Fellows of the American Physical Society
Prisoners and detainees of Argentina
People with schizoid personality disorder